Anna Chakvetadze was the defending champion, but lost in the second round to Dinara Safina.

Elena Dementieva won the title, defeating Serena Williams in the final 5–7, 6–1, 6–1.

Seeds
The top four seeds received a bye into the second round. 

  Svetlana Kuznetsova (semifinals)
  Maria Sharapova (second round)
  Anna Chakvetadze (second round)
  Serena Williams (final)
  Marion Bartoli (second round)
  Amélie Mauresmo (first round)
  Patty Schnyder (second round)
  Nicole Vaidišová (quarterfinals)

Draw

Finals

Top half

Bottom half

External links
Draw and Qualifying draw

Kremlin Cup
Kremlin Cup